Royal Prussian Jagdstaffel 42, commonly abbreviated to Jasta 42, was a "hunting group" (i.e., fighter squadron) of the Luftstreitkräfte, the air arm of the Imperial German Army during World War I. The unit would score over 30 aerial victories during the war. The squadron's victories came at the expense of four killed in action, one wounded in action, and one taken prisoner of war.

History
Jasta 42 was founded in September 1917 at Flieger-Abteilung (Flier Detachment) 3, Gotha, Germany. The squadron became operational on 18 December 1917. On 17 April 1918, it was consolidated into Jagdgruppe 12, which was commanded by Heinrich Kroll.

Commanding officer (Staffelführer)
 Karl Odebrett (on leave during July 1918)

Duty stations
 Gotha, Germany: September 1917
 Mars-la-Tour, France: 20 December 1917
 Froidmont: 26 March 1918
 Ercheu, France: 17 April 1918
 Grécourt, France: late May 1918
 Clastres, France: 15 August 1918
 Parpeville, France
 Le Brule
 Bois Saint Denis
 Thuilles

Operations
Beginning 20 December 1917, Jasta 42 flew aerial support for Armee-Abteilung B. On 26 March 1918, they moved to support 7 Armee. In late May 1918, they were reassigned to support of 18 Armee; they remained in this role until war's end.

References

Bibliography
 

42
Military units and formations established in 1917
1917 establishments in Germany
Military units and formations disestablished in 1918